Heneage may refer to:

Baron Heneage, a title in the Peerage of the United Kingdom
Heneage knot, a decorative heraldic knot

People with the surname
Algernon Heneage (1833–1915), Royal Navy officer dubbed "Pompo"
Arthur Heneage (1881–1971), British Conservative Party politician
Clement Walker Heneage VC (1831–1901), English recipient of the Victoria Cross
Edward Heneage, 1st Baron Heneage PC JP DL (1840–1922), British Liberal and Liberal Unionist politician
Edward Heneage (cricketer) (1775–1810), English first-class cricketer
George Heneage (1800–1864), British Whig and later Conservative Party politician
George Heneage (priest) (1483–1549), Dean of Lincoln, England
George Heneage (16th century MP), MP for Great Grimsby and Orford, England
Harry R. Heneage (1884–1950), American football player and college athletics administrator
James Heneage, British historical fiction writer
John Heneage (c. 1485–1557), MP for Great Grimsby, England
John Heneage Jesse (1815–1874), English historian
Thomas Heneage (1533–1595), MP for Boston at the 1563 Parliament of England

People with the given name
Heneage Finch, 1st Earl of Aylesford, PC, KC (1649–1719), English lawyer and statesman
Heneage Finch, 1st Earl of Nottingham, PC (1621–1682), Lord Chancellor of England
Heneage Finch, 3rd Earl of Winchilsea (1628–1689), of Eastwell, Kent, 3rd Earl of Winchilsea
Heneage Finch, 4th Earl of Aylesford (1751–1812), son of Heneage Finch, 3rd Earl of Aylesford, was a British peer
Heneage Finch, 5th Earl of Aylesford (1786–1859), British peer, eldest son of Heneage Finch, 4th Earl of Aylesford
Heneage Finch (surveyor), (1793–1850), known for his surveying work in the Colony of New South Wales, Australia
Heneage Gibbes (1837–1912), British pathologist
Heneage Legge (1788–1844), MP for Banbury, England
Heneage Legge (1845–1911), MP for St George's Hanover Square, nephew of the above
Heneage Montagu (1675–1698), younger son of Robert Montagu, 3rd Earl of Manchester and Anne Yelverton
Heneage Wheeler (fl. 1904), cricketer who played one first-class match for Somerset
Heneage Wileman (1888–1926), English footballer

See also
 John Walker-Heneage (1730–1806), MP for Cricklade, England

Surnames of British Isles origin